Sister R. S. Subbalakshmi (sometimes spelled Subbulakshmi or Subhalakshmi) (18 August 1886 – 20 December 1969), was a social reformer and educationist in India.

Early life and education
Subbalakshmi was born at the remote Thanjavur village of Rishiyur, the other view was Mylapore in Madras as the first daughter of Visalakshi and R. V. Subramania Iyer (a civil engineer. Her father, R.V. Subramania Iyer was employed in the Public Works Department of the Madras Presidency),. They belonged to an orthodox Tamil Brahmin family from the Thanjavur district. Subbalakshmi was ranked first in the public examination in the Chingleput District, for the fourth standard of the Madras Presidency at the age of nine. She was married while very young, as was customary, but her husband died soon after. In April 1911, she became the first Hindu woman to graduate from the Madras Presidency and she did this with First Class Honors from Presidency College, Madras.

Work

In 1912, she founded the Sarada Ladies Union to provide a meeting ground and platform for housewives and other ladies to promote consciousness among them regarding social problems and to encourage them to educate themselves and the Sarada Illam or Widow's Home, which rehabilitated and educated child widows in Madras. Later, in 1921  or 1927, she established the Sarada Vidyalaya under the aegis of the Sarada Ladies Union.   
In 1922 she inaugurated the Lady Willingdon Training College and Practice School and was its first principal. She also established the Srividya Kalanilayam, a school for adult women at Mylapore in 1942, and while she was the president of the Mylapore Ladies Club, she formed the Mylapore Ladies Club School Society, in 1956, which was then renamed as the Vidya Mandir School, in Mylapore. In addition, she was involved in setting up a social welfare center for women and children in Madambakkam village. near Tambaram, in 1954.

Awards and recognition
The government of the British Raj honoured her with the Kaisar-i-Hind Gold Medal for Public Service in 1920, and in 1958, after independence of India, the Indian Government awarded her the Padma Shri.

Political career
While she was in government service as Headmistress of the Lady Willingdon Training College and Superintendent of the Ice House Hostel, Subbalakshmi was prohibited from joining the Women's Indian Association. To keep her school running Subbalakshmi compromised on her beliefs and efforts against child marriage. Nevertheless, using her fluency in Tamil, she made efforts to abolish child marriage and to encourage education of girls. The historic, first conference, of the then newly established All India Women's Conference, called the "All India Women's Conference on Educational Reform", was held at the Fergusson College, Poona in January 1927. Subbalakshmi was one of the fifty eight prominent delegates attending this meeting. She actively supported the Child Marriage Restraint Act, passed in 1930, and appeared before the Joshi committee which formulated the Act instrumental in raising the marriageable age of girls to fourteen and boys to sixteen. After retirement, she was involved in the activities of the Women's Indian Association, through which she befriended Annie Besant and others. She served as a nominated member of the Madras Legislative Council from 1952 to 1956.

Death
Subbulakshmi died on 20 December 1969 on an Ekadashi Day.

References

Further reading

External links

Indian women activists
Indian women educational theorists
Recipients of the Padma Shri in social work
1886 births
1969 deaths
Presidency College, Chennai alumni
Indian social reformers
University of Madras alumni
Tamil scholars
19th-century Indian women
19th-century Indian people
20th-century Indian politicians
Scholars from Chennai
Indian Tamil people
Women in Tamil Nadu politics
Women's education in India
20th-century Indian educational theorists
Scientists from Tamil Nadu
20th-century Indian women scientists
20th-century Indian social scientists
Women scientists from Tamil Nadu
Trade unionists from Tamil Nadu
Indian women trade unionists
20th-century Indian women politicians
Politicians from Chennai
Women educators from Tamil Nadu
Educators from Tamil Nadu
20th-century women educators